Michel Mehech Haddad (31 May 1914 – 3 July 2008) was a Chilean basketball player. He competed in the 1936 Summer Olympics.

References

External links

1914 births
2008 deaths
Chilean men's basketball players
Olympic basketball players of Chile
Basketball players at the 1936 Summer Olympics
Sportspeople from Homs